Elinor Sisulu (née Batezat; born 9 March 1958) is a South African writer and activist.

Biography
She was born Elinor Batezat in Salisbury, Rhodesia (now Harare, Zimbabwe) to Francis Batezat and Betty Stuhardt, who was the daughter of George Stuhardt. She grew up in Bulawayo. She was educated at the University of Zimbabwe, at the United Nations Institute for Economic Planning and Development in Dakar, Senegal, and at the International Institute of Social Studies in The Hague. While in Holland, she met Max Sisulu, whom she would later marry.

She worked as an economic researcher for the Ministry of Labour in Zimbabwe. From 1987 to 1990, she worked at the Lusaka office of the International Labour Organization. Sisulu returned to Johannesburg with her family in 1991 after the end of apartheid. She worked mainly as a freelance writer and editor from 1991 to 1998.

In 1994, she wrote a children's book The Day Gogo Went to Vote about the first democratic election held in South Africa. In 2002, she published a biography about her husband's parents, entitled Walter and Albertina Sisulu: In Our Lifetime, which received the Noma Award for Publishing in Africa and was runner-up for the Sunday Times Alan Paton Non-Fiction Award. She also published A Different Kind of Holocaust: A Personal Reflection on HIV/AIDS.

Sisulu helped establish the Crisis Coalition of Zimbabwe and works in its Johannesburg office. She has prepared reports for the Independent Electoral Authority of South Africa and for the World Food Programme. She organized a symposium for Themba Lesizwe on Civil Society and Justice in Zimbabwe, held in Johannesburg in 2003.

Sisulu wrote the foreword to Jestina Mukoko's book The Abduction and Trial of Jestina Mukoko: The Fight for Human Rights in Zimbabwe.

She is a board member for the Open Society Initiative for Southern Africa and the National Arts Festival, a trustee for the Heal Zimbabwe Trust and chair of the Book Development Foundation of the Centre for the Book in Cape Town.

References 

1958 births
Living people
South African children's writers
South African biographers
South African human rights activists
University of Zimbabwe alumni
People from Harare
South African women writers
South African writers
Women biographers